The white-bibbed antbird (Myrmoderus loricatus) is a species of passerine bird in the family Thamnophilidae. It is endemic to Brazil.

Its natural habitats are subtropical or tropical moist lowland forest and subtropical or tropical moist montane forest.

The white-bibbed antbird was formerly included in the genus Myrmeciza. A molecular phylogenetic study published in 2013 found that Myrmeciza, as then defined, was polyphyletic. In the resulting rearrangement to create monotypic genera four species including the white-bibbed antbird were moved to the resurrected genus Myrmoderus.

References

white-bibbed antbird
Birds of the Atlantic Forest
Endemic birds of Brazil
white-bibbed antbird
Taxonomy articles created by Polbot